Kwasimukamba, Quassi or Graman Quacy (also spelled Kwasi and Quasi) (1692 in Guinea (region); 12 March 1787 in  Paramaribo) was a enslaved Surinamese man, later freedman. He was known as healer, botanist and slave hunter in service of the Dutch colonists in Suriname. He is also known for having given his name to the plant genus Quassia.

Biography 
Quassi's roots were among the Kwa speaking Akan people of present-day Ghana, but as a child he was enslaved and brought to the New World. In Suriname, a Dutch colony in South America, he was first put to work in the sugar plantation New Timotebo. 

Quassi had great linguistic and botanical knowledge. He was famed as a healer. He obtained his freedom in 1755. 

Quassi participated in the colonial wars against the Saramaka maroons as a scout and negotiator for the Dutch. He lost his right ear during the fighting. For this reason the Surinamese Maroons remember him as a traitor. In the late 1760s, he was owner of a plantation. 

In February 1772, he visited the Netherlands, and was given an audience by William V, Prince of Orange. He returned to Suriname in September 1772. 

On 12 March 1787, Governor Wichers announced that Quassi had died in Paramaribo at the age of at least 95. He was buried by the Free Negro Corps.

Legacy 
One of his remedies was a bitter tea that he used to treat infections by intestinal parasites, this concoction was based on the plant Quassia amara which Carl Linnaeus named after him, as the discoverer of its medicinal properties. Quassia continues to be used in industrially produced medicines against intestinal parasites today. In contemporary accounts he was described as "one of the most extraordinary black men in Suriname, and perhaps the world"

See also
List of kidnappings

References

1692 births
1787 deaths
18th-century Dutch botanists
18th-century Surinamese people
Dutch people of Akan descent
Dutch slaves
Kidnapped African children
Saramaka
Surinamese botanists
Surinamese emigrants to the Netherlands
Surinamese people of Akan descent
Surinamese slaves